The Philippine Senate Committee on Trade, Commerce and Entrepreneurship is a standing committee of the Senate of the Philippines.

Jurisdiction 
According to the Rules of the Senate, the committee handles all matters relating to:

 Domestic and foreign trade and private corporations
 Micro, small and medium enterprises (MSMEs)
 Social enterprises
 Promotion of entrepreneurship and the regulation of entrepreneurial practice
 Patents, copyrights, trade names and trademarks
 Standards, weights, measures and designs
 Quality control, control and stabilization of prices of commodities
 Consumer protection
 Handicrafts and cottage industries
 Marketing of commodities
 The Department of Trade and Industry
 The Optical Media Board
 The Intellectual Property Office of the Philippines
 The Securities and Exchange Commission
 The Office of the Presidential Adviser on Investment and Economic Affairs

Members, 18th Congress 
Based on the Rules of the Senate, the Senate Committee on Trade, Commerce and Entrepreneurship has 9 members.

The President Pro Tempore, the Majority Floor Leader, and the Minority Floor Leader are ex officio members.

Here are the members of the committee in the 18th Congress as of September 24, 2020:

Committee secretary: Jingle Concon-Allam

See also 

 List of Philippine Senate committees

References 

Trade